At least 12 special routes of U.S. Route 16 have existed, including four in Michigan.

Existing

Newcastle business route

U.S. Route 16 Business (US 16 Business) in Newcastle, Wyoming is mainline US 16 signed as a Business Route. It includes West Main Street east of U.S. Route 16 Truck (Newcastle, Wyoming), and South Summit Street east of West Main Street and North Summit Street.

Newcastle truck route

U.S. Route 16 Truck (US 16 Truck) in Newcastle, Wyoming runs south of mainline US 16. It begins at West Main Street between Quarter Horse Drive and Sixth Avenue, directly across from Seventh Avenue, and Divide Avenue and South Summit Street.

Custer–Keystone alternate route

U.S. Route 16A (US 16A or U.S. Route 16-Alternate) is a  scenic United States highway. It is an alternate route for US 16. It splits from US 16 in the Black Hills of the southwestern part of the U.S. state of South Dakota. The highway's western terminus is an intersection with US 16, US 385, and South Dakota Highway 89 (SD 89) in Custer, South Dakota. The eastern terminus is at an interchange with US 16 called the Keystone Wye south of Rapid City, South Dakota. Portions of US 16A are known as the Iron Mountain Road.

Hill City truck route

U.S. Route 16 Truck (US 16 Truck) in Hill City, South Dakota runs east of mainline US 16/US 385 along Walnut Avenue, and is also overlapped with US 385 Truck. It begins at Main Street north of Pond Court, then runs alongside the Mickelson Trail. Across the street from MacGregor Street the street name changes to Railroad Avenue for the South Dakota State Railroad Museum and the former Chicago, Burlington and Quincy Railroad depot, which serves the Black Hills Central Railroad. The name Walnut Avenue is revived as "North Walnut Avenue" as US Truck Route 16/385 ends at East Main Street.

Rapid City truck route

U.S. Route 16 Truck (US 16 Truck) in Rapid City, South Dakota runs from US 16 in the southern portion of the city to Interstate 90's Exit 61 on the city's eastern boundary. The route, recognized by the American Association of State Highway and Transportation Officials as "U.S. Route 16 Bypass", was established in 1989 and its relocation eastward was approved in 2005. While not reflected in these records, the route is signposted along Interstate 90 westward to Interstate 190 and US 16 at I-90's Exit 57.

Former

Rapid City business loop

Wall–Kadoka alternate route

US Highway 16A is the former designation of South Dakota Highway 240, serving Badlands National Park.

Watertown business loop

See also

References

 
16
16
16
16